Jor is a 2008 Indian Bengali-language action film directed by Swapan Saha. The movie features Jeet and Barsa Priyadarshini. It was the first Bengali film of Oriya film actress Barsa Priyadarshini. It was dubbed into Odia as Juge Juge Mun Tumara. It is a remake of the 2003 Telugu film Okkadu.

Plot
Surya (Jeet) is a sportsman. He loves to run and win championships in Kolkata. Once on a championship tour, he goes to Siliguri. There he runs into an influential gang leader Indrajit (Subrat Dutta) who forcefully tries to make Sumi (Barsha Priyadarshini) his wife. After some struggle and fights, Surya is able to escape from Siliguri with Sumi. After coming to his home in Kolkata, Surya hides Sumi from his family members. He attempts to arrange for Sumi's departure to the US where her relatives reside. Indrajit and his goons arrive in Kolkata in search of Sumi. They use their political and social influence to the local police who locks up Surya. Eventually, Surja makes the police officer understand that he loves Sumi and he lets him go since the police officer is an old friend of Surya's father (Deepankar De). Surja arrives to get Sumi back from Indrajit's house. Meanwhile, Indrajit's goons go to Surja's home and kidnap Surya's sister. Surya eventually fights after his father gives him permission to fight for good cause. Indrajit dies by his mother during the fight coincidentally.

Cast
 Jeet as Surya
 Varsha Priyadarshini as Sumi
 Deepankar De as Surya's father
 Mimi Dutta as Tina
 Rudranil Ghosh as Shankar Narayan
 Subrat Dutta as Indrajit
 Anamika Saha as Indrajit's mother

Soundtrack 

The music and background score of the film is composed by S. P. Venkatesh. Mano, Kavita Krishnamurthy, and V. V. Prasanna gave their voices for the album.

References

External links
 

2008 films
2000s Bengali-language films
Bengali-language Indian films
Bengali remakes of Telugu films
Indian sports films
Indian action films
2000s masala films
Films scored by S. P. Venkatesh
Films directed by Swapan Saha
2008 action films
2000s sports films
Kabaddi in India
Sports action films